The New York–Pennsylvania League of 1923 through 1937 was an American minor league baseball circuit, the forerunner to the modern Double-A Eastern League.

History
The New York–Pennsylvania League (NY–PL) began in 1923 as Class B circuit and operated at that level through 1932. It then upgraded to Class A for the final five seasons of its existence. When Hartford, Connecticut, entered the loop in 1938, the NY–PL adopted the Eastern League name, and has used that identity since (except for 2021, when it was known as the Double-A Northeast). Previous editions of the Eastern League had existed from 1883–1886, 1892–1911 and 1916–1932. The second incarnation of the Eastern League changed its name in 1912 to the current International League.

The NY–PL's longest-tenured franchises during the 1923–1937 period included Binghamton, a New York Yankees affiliate, Elmira, Scranton, Wilkes-Barre and Williamsport, all of which were members for the league's 15-year existence.

The NY–PL of 1923–1937 was the second of three leagues to bear the name:
 The original New York–Pennsylvania League played for one season, 1891.
 In 1957, the Pennsylvania–Ontario–New York League (PONY League) changed its name to the New York–Penn League and operated under that identity until folding in 2020, beginning as a Class D loop and ending as a Class A Short Season league.

Member teams

Albany Senators
Allentown Brooks
Binghamton Triplets
Elmira Colonels
Elmira Pioneers
Elmira Red Birds/Red Wings

Harrisburg Senators
Hazleton Mountaineers
Hazleton Red Sox
Oneonta Indians
Reading Keys
Reading Red Sox

Scranton Miners
Shamokin Indians
Shamokin Shammies
Syracuse Stars
Trenton Senators
Utica Utes

Wilkes-Barre Barons
Williamsport Billies
Williamsport Grays
York White Roses

League champions

 1923—Williamsport Billies
 1924—Williamsport Grays
 1925—York White Roses
 1926—Scranton Miners
 1927—Harrisburg Senators

 1928—Harrisburg Senators
 1929—Binghamton Triplets
 1930—Wilkes-Barre Barons
 1931—Harrisburg Senators
 1932—Wilkes-Barre Barons

 1933—Binghamton Triplets
 1934—Williamsport Grays
 1935—Binghamton Triplets
 1936—Scranton Miners
 1937—Elmira Pioneers

Baseball leagues in New York (state)
Defunct minor baseball leagues in the United States
Baseball leagues in Pennsylvania
Sports leagues established in 1923
Sports leagues disestablished in 1937